Time Riders is a 4-part 1991 CITV show directed by Michael Winterbottom and starring Haydn Gwynne as Dr. B. B. Miller, a motorbike riding time traveler.

Location filming was carried out at the Polytechnic of Wales for scenes set in the modern day (Part One and the end of Part Four), whilst those set in the past (Parts Two, Three and the bulk of Part Four) occurred at Caerphilly Castle.

A novelisation of the series, written by Eldridge (ISBN  ) was published in 1991. It was illustrated by Mark Robertson.

Cast
 Haydn Gwynne as Dr. B. B. Miller
 Kenneth Hall as Ben
 Ian McNeice as Leather Hardbones
 Paul Bown as Captain
 Clive Merrison as Professor Crow
 Kerry Shale as Hepworth

Episode List

References

External links 
 
 Curious British Telly

1991 British television series debuts
1991 British television series endings
1990s British children's television series
British time travel television series
Television series set in the future
ITV children's television shows
Motorcycle television series
English-language television shows
Television shows produced by Thames Television
Television series by Fremantle (company)
1990s British science fiction television series